The Encounter is a 2002 Turkish-Hungarian drama film, co-written, co-produced and directed by Ömer Kavur, starring Uğur Polat as a man embarking on a new life. It was the final film of Turkish director Ömer Kavur, who described it as, "the unadorned story of an interesting search in the midst of extraordinary circumstances with surrealistic overtones."

References

External links 
 

2003 drama films
2003 films
Films set in Turkey
Films shot in Turkey
Golden Orange Award for Best Film winners
Turkish drama films
Hungarian drama films
2000s Turkish-language films